Sharples School is a co-educational secondary school located in the Sharples area of Bolton in the English county of Greater Manchester.

Established in 1974, the School celebrated its 40th anniversary in 2014.

Previously a community school administered by Bolton Metropolitan Borough Council, in June 2016 Sharples School converted to academy status. The school continues to coordinate with Bolton Metropolitan Borough Council for admissions.

Sharples School offers GCSEs, BTECs and the CiDA as programmes of study for pupils. The school also has a specialism  in STEM (Science, Engineering, Technology and Maths).

References

External links
Sharples School official website

Secondary schools in the Metropolitan Borough of Bolton
Educational institutions established in 1974
1974 establishments in England
Academies in the Metropolitan Borough of Bolton